Chiraplothrips is a genus of thrips in the family Phlaeothripidae.

Species
 Chiraplothrips faureanus
 Chiraplothrips graminellus
 Chiraplothrips sudanensis

References

Phlaeothripidae
Thrips
Thrips genera